Latties Brook (alternatively "Lattie's Brook") is a small community in the Canadian province of Nova Scotia, located in East Hants, Hants County.

References
Latties Brook on Destination Nova Scotia

Communities in Hants County, Nova Scotia
General Service Areas in Nova Scotia